Roxanne Bosch Guinoo-Yap (born February 14, 1986) is a Filipino actress. Since April 2012, she is employed by GMA Network, having transferred from ABS-CBN as a contract of GMA Artist Center for three years. In 2015, she transferred back to her home network ABS-CBN. She is set to appear as young Amelia Guerrero in The General's Daughter. Before her transfer to GMA Network in 2012, she returned to showbiz as a brief Talent5 Artist and appeared in Valiente and an episode in Real Confessions. In 2008–2010, she was also with TV5 to appear in Everybody Hapi.

Career
In 2004, Guinoo joined the popular reality TV show Star Circle Teen Quest aired on ABS-CBN and made it into the group of finalists known as the "Magic Circle of 5", along with co-stars Hero Angeles, Sandara Park, Joross Gamboa, and Melissa Ricks. In June 2004, the televised live final was held in Araneta Coliseum, where she finished in second place. She was introduced as one of the newest members of ABS-CBN's Star Magic. She made her ABS-CBN debut in the youth oriented drama SCQ Reload, with her SCQ co-finalists.

Guinoo has also starred in movies, such as Now That I Have You, Can This Be Love, and D' Anothers.

Her big break came when she was cast in a leading role in the drama series Sineserye Presents: Natutulog Ba ang Diyos?, with local television stars Dina Bonnevie and Rosanna Roces. In 2008, she took up her first solo role on ABS-CBN with a show entitled Ligaw na Bulaklak which airs in an afternoon slot. She starred in the popular comedy series Everybody Hapi over TV5 (replacing ABC 5) as "Jenny", alongside John Estrada, Eugene Domingo, Long Mejia, Alex Gonzaga and Matt Evans. This marked her first project in the Kapatid Network before returning to ABS-CBN.

She returned to TV5 in 2012 and appeared in Valiente and an episode in Real Confessions before moving to GMA Network same year. The following year, she made her main character debuts in Home Sweet Home and Pyra: Ang Babaeng Apoy.

In 2015, she was set to come back and do a TV series on her home network ABS-CBN via Walang Iwanan.

She is semi-active in showbiz.

Personal life
She married Filipino-Chinese Elton Yap on January 23, 2011. Together they had a daughter born in September 2010 named Rain Eliana Guinoo-Yap.

From 2004 to 2006 she dated Joross Gamboa, her co-star in Star Circle Quest. In 2007, it was confirmed that she was dating former co-star Jake Cuenca. They first teamed up professionally in Sineserye Presents: Natutulog Ba ang Diyos?.

Filmography

Television

Films

References

External links
 

1986 births
Living people
Filipino television actresses
Filipino child actresses
Actresses from Cavite
Star Magic
Star Circle Quest participants
21st-century Filipino actresses